Victor Mirshauswka (born 27 April 1941) is a Brazilian basketball player. He competed in the men's tournament at the 1964 Summer Olympics.

References

External links
 

1941 births
Living people
Brazilian men's basketball players
1963 FIBA World Championship players
Olympic basketball players of Brazil
Basketball players at the 1964 Summer Olympics
People from Brest District
Belarusian emigrants to Brazil
Byelorussian Soviet Socialist Republic people
Olympic bronze medalists for Brazil
Olympic medalists in basketball
Medalists at the 1964 Summer Olympics
Basketball players at the 1963 Pan American Games
Pan American Games silver medalists for Brazil
Pan American Games medalists in basketball
FIBA World Championship-winning players
Sport Club Corinthians Paulista basketball players
Medalists at the 1963 Pan American Games